Planispira is a genus of gastropods belonging to the family Camaenidae.

The species of this genus are found in Southeastern Asia, Australia.

Species:

Planispira admirabilis 
Planispira adonarana 
Planispira albodentata 
Planispira aldrichi 
Planispira armstrongi 
Planispira atkinsoni 
Planispira atrofusca 
Planispira buelowi 
Planispira deaniana (Ford, 1890)
Planispira dulcissma 
Planispira exceptiuncula 
Planispira expansa 
Planispira finschi 
Planispira flavidula 
Planispira gabata 
Planispira infracta 
Planispira keiensis 
Planispira kendigiana 
Planispira kurri 
Planispira latizona 
Planispira liedtkei 
Planispira loxotropis 
Planispira margaritis 
Planispira moluccensis 
Planispira nagporensis 
Planispira pruinosa 
Planispira quadrifasciata 
Planispira rollei 
Planispira scheepmakeri 
Planispira semiquadrivolvis 
Planispira simbangensis 
Planispira spiriplana 
Planispira sumbana 
Planispira torticollis 
Planispira tricolor 
Planispira zebra 
Planispira zonaria

References

Camaenidae